Nico Cartosio (born Nicola Cartosia, May 5, 1978) is a contemporary classical composer and producer.

Biography
Nico was born in USSR. His mother is from Latvia, father is from Georgia. Family name is an exact match with the small Italian commune 'Cartosio' in Piedmont.

There were no musicians in his family. His parents connected their lives with science, physics, and mathematics, and tried to pass their passion on son. However, Nico showed great interest in playing the piano. He began composing music at the age of five. In the 1980s he studied at a special music school for gifted children.

In 1996, because of his parents’ will, Nico entered the Faculty of Journalism. After graduation for a long time, his career was related to the media industry. From 2000 to 2012 he worked as an editor, editor-in-chief, copywriter and scriptwriter. Also he directed several documentaries (оne of them is dedicated to the famous Russian-Jewish exiled poet Joseph Brodsky, Nobel laureate in Literature 1987) and wrote soundtracks.

After then he began to produce his own TV projects. In 2013 he created and launched TV channel “FRIDAY”. It initially focused on travel and lifestyles programming. A list of television programs formerly or currently broadcast by Friday consists of original formats and the most successful Ukrainian reality shows.

Music career
In 2016, he decided to return to his favorite passion, music, and began to prepare for the release of his first album.

The debut album "Melting" was released in April 2019. It included eight instrumental compositions and one album cover song. Nico recorded this song together with Angelina Jordan, the finalist America's Got Talent: The Champions. The album was recorded at the legendary Abbey Road Studios in London with the participation of the orchestra, whose musicians worked on the best soundtracks of Hollywood films, conductor Gavin Greenaway (the permanent conductor of the Hans Zimmer Show Orchestra) and soloists John Mills (Violin) and John Lenehan (Piano) got involved.

The album reached number 13 on the Billboard “Classical Crossover Albums” chart and number 18 on the “Classical Albums” world chart.

At the end of 2018, a short documentary "The true story of composer Nico Cartosio" appeared from the backstage materials, in which the composer shared the history of the creation of the first album and his impressions.

Nico is officially a member of the Grammy Recording Academy since 2020.

Now the composer is working on a new instrumental album and writing music for the ballet.

Discography

Studio albums

Compilations
 The best of Nico Cartosio (2019)

Singles
 Long Island Elegy (Original Motion Picture Soundtrack) (2019)
 Siberia (2019)
 Girl on an iceberg (piano version) (2021)

Music video
Nico is also well known to the press for his song's videos. They always tell stories and contain many meanings and images. The video has repeatedly received awards at international festivals.

Awards

Collaboration
Frederick Rousseau, a famous musician who make covers to popular melodies with LED visualization, selected Nico's first album compositions twice for his work: Melting in 2019 and Girl on an iceberg in 2021.

Notes

References

External links
 

Contemporary classical composers
Male film score composers
1978 births
Living people